The European Society for the Study of Western Esotericism (ESSWE) is Europe's only scholarly society for the study of Western esotericism. Founded in 2002, the society promotes academic study of the various manifestations of Western esotericism from late antiquity to the present, and works to secure the future development of the field.

Publications 
The peer-reviewed journal Aries, and the associated Aries book series are published by Brill under the auspices of the ESSWE. Aries was published in a first series by La Table d'Emeraude from 1985 to 1999, before a second series began to be published by Brill in 2001. The Aries book series was launched in 2006. The society also publishes a periodic Newsletter.

Between 2016 and 2018, the ESSWE funded the hosting and database costs of the journal Correspondences: Journal for the Study of Esotericism.

International conferences 
The ESSWE holds an international conference in a different European country every two years, and holds a workshop for graduate students in years in which there is no conference. Past conferences have been in Tübingen (2007), Strasbourg and Messina (2009), Szeged (2011), Gothenburg (2013), Riga (2015), Erfurt (2017), and Amsterdam (2019).

1st: July 2007, University of Tübingen, "Constructing Tradition: Means and Myths of Transmission in Western Esotericism."

2nd: July 2009, University of Strasbourg, "Capitals of European Esotericism and Transcultural Dialogue."

3rd: July 2011, University of Szeged, "Lux in Tenebris: The Visual and the Symbolic in Western Esotericism"

4th: June 2013, University of Gothenburg, "Western Esotericism and Health."

5th: April 2015, University of Latvia, "Western Esotericism and the East."

6th: June 2017, University of Erfurt, "Western Esotericism and Deviance."

7th: July 2019, University of Amsterdam, "Western Esotericism and Consciousness: Visions, Voices, Altered States."

Other activities 
The ESSWE provides various resources on its website, awards prizes and travel bursaries to recognize and encourage younger scholars. It has three regional networks, the Scandinavian Network for the Academic Study of Western Esotericism (SNASWE), the Israeli Network for the Study of Western Esotericsm (INASWE), and the Irish Network for the Study of Esotericism and Paganism (INSEP) and two thematic research networks, the Contemporary Esotericism Research Network (ContERN) and the ESSWE Network for the Study of Esotericism in Antiquity (NSEA).

Relationships 
The ESSWE is an affiliated society of the Project AWE (Aesthetics of Western Esotericism), International Association for the History of Religions (IAHR), and a related scholarly organization of the American Academy of Religion (AAR).

In 2014, a related Central and Eastern European Network for the Academic Study of Western Esotericism (CEENASWE) was founded at the Central European University, Budapest.

Current officers 
President: Andreas Kilcher (Eidgenössische Technische Hochschule Zürich, Switzerland)
Vice President: Boaz Huss (Ben Gurion University of the Negev, Israel)
Secretary: Mark Sedgwick (University of Aarhus, Denmark)
Treasurer and Membership Secretary: Egil Asprem (Stockholm University, Sweden)
Webmaster: Peter J. Forshaw (University of Amsterdam, The Netherlands)
Henrik Bogdan (University of Gothenburg, Sweden)
Jean-Pierre Brach (Ecole Pratique des Hautes Etudes, Sorbonne, Paris, France)
Wouter J. Hanegraaff (University of Amsterdam, The Netherlands)
Birgit Menzel (Universität Mainz, Germany)
Sophie Page (University College, London)
Marco Pasi (University of Amsterdam, The Netherlands)
György E. Szőnyi (University of Szeged, Hungary)
Helmut Zander (Ruhr-Universität, Bochum, Germany)

Notable past officers 
Antoine Faivre (University of the Sorbonne, France)
Nicholas Goodrick-Clarke (University of Exeter, UK)

Further reading 
 Gregory D. Alles. Religious studies: a global view. USA & Canada: Routledge, 2008.
 Kripal J.J., Hanegraaff W.J. Introduction: things we don't talk about // Kripal J. J., Hanegraaff W.J. (eds.) Hidden intercourse. Eros and sexuality in the history of Western Esotericism. Leiden & Brill, 2008.

Bibliography

Aries Book Series: Texts and Studies in Western Esotericism

References

External links

Aries: Journal for the Study of Western Esotericism
ContERN website

E
Religious studies
Learned societies